Charles Pope Caldwell (June 18, 1875 - July 31, 1940) was an American lawyer and politician who served three terms as a U.S. Representative from New York from 1915 to 1921.

Biography
Born near Bastrop, Texas, Caldwell attended the public schools.  He graduated from the University of Texas Law School in 1898 and from Yale Law School in 1899.  He was admitted to the bar in Austin, Texas, in 1898, and later in New York City, where he commenced practice in 1900.

Political career 
He was appointed by Governor John Alden Dix a delegate to the Atlantic Deeper Water Ways Convention in 1910.  He served as delegate to the Democratic National Convention in 1912.

Congress 
Caldwell was elected as a Democrat to the Sixty-fourth, Sixty-fifth, and Sixty-sixth Congresses (March 4, 1915 – March 3, 1921).  He declined to be a candidate for renomination in 1920.  He resumed the practice of law in New York City.

Later career and death 
He was appointed associate justice of the court of special sessions of New York City January 1, 1926, and served until December 1935.  He resumed the practice of law on Long Island.  He died in Sunnyside, Queens, on July 31, 1940.  His remains were cremated and the ashes scattered over his ancestral estate in Bastrop County, Texas.

References

1875 births
1940 deaths
University of Texas School of Law alumni
Yale Law School alumni
People from Bastrop County, Texas
Democratic Party members of the United States House of Representatives from New York (state)